Martín Vázquez may refer to:

Rafael Martín Vázquez, Spanish football midfielder
Martín Vázquez (referee), Uruguayan football referee